Ye-jin is a Korean feminine given name. Its meaning depends on the hanja used to write each syllable of the name. There are 34 hanja with the reading "ye" and 43 hanja with the reading "jin" on the South Korean government's official list of hanja which may be used in given names.

People with this name include:
Im Ye-jin (born Im Ki-hee, 1960), South Korean actress
Park Ye-jin (born 1981), South Korean actress
Son Ye-jin (born Son Eon-jin, 1982), South Korean actress
Ailee (Korean name Lee Yejin, born 1989), Korean-American singer and songwriter
Pyo Ye-jin (born 1992), South Korean actress
Kim Ye-jin (born 1999), South Korean short track speed skater
Chu Ye-jin (born 2001), South Korean actress

See also
List of Korean given names

References

Korean feminine given names